Delta Force: America Strikes Back! is a role-playing game published by Task Force Games in 1986.

Description
Delta Force: America Strikes Back! is a modern military/espionage system depicting characters who are members of the West's elite anti-terrorist units including the United States' Delta Force and Britain's SAS. The basic game consists of a rule book (48 pages); a "Warbook" (40 pages) describing the composition of twenty terrorist and eight anti-terrorist groups and stats for their standard weapons, equipment and vehicles; and a book of three scenarios (32 pages). The game also includes a card stock GM's screen.

Character creation
Characters have 4 primary characteristics (Strength, Agility, Dexterity, and Intelligence) and 4 secondary characteristics (Training, Endurance, Experience, and Reason) that are randomly generated by die rolls. Stamina is how much damage the character can take. The Companion Book added Perception, Appearance, Speech, and Attitude characteristics to flesh out the character's personality.

Skills are bought with points and are broadly similar to the system from Twilight:2000. "Native Skills" were acquired by the character prior to service. "Service Skills" depend on which branch of service and anti-terrorist unit the character joined. Skills are first bought as a generic level (say, in "Climbing") and can be specialized in a  related skill (like in "Mountain Climbing").

Publication history
Delta Force: America Strikes Back! (TF4501) was designed by William H. Keith, Jr., and was published in 1986 by Task Force Games as a boxed set that contained all the basic rules materials and a dice set. The Delta Force Companion (TF4504) was a rules expansion that added new content.  

Delta Force was the first role-playing game from Task Force Games.

Adventure modules
Terror At Sea (TF4502) The Abu Nidal Organization has hijacked an Italian cruise ship, the SS Neptuno, in the Mediterranean. The President doesn't want a repeat of the Achille Lauro incident and wants to handle the matter while it is still at sea. The team must find a way to infiltrate the ship, subdue the terrorists, and rescue the hostages. Alternately, the players represent different elements of the strategic, tactical, and diplomatic forces managing the crisis.Desert Sun (TF4503) Israeli intelligence has discovered that  Colonel Muammar Gaddafi, the dictator of Libya, has a secret facility that is capable of producing nuclear weapons that he is using to build small portable "pony nukes". There is some chatter that Gaddafi plans on using any completed weapons in a campaign of blackmail and terrorist attacks against the West. The team has to enter Libya, find the site, obtain evidence and intelligence about the Libyan nuclear program, and then sabotage or destroy the facility.

Reception
Phil Frances reviewed Delta Force: America Strikes Back for White Dwarf #84, and stated that "In all, not a bad game, I suppose, but it's very unethical and awfully tasteless."

Reviews
Different Worlds #47

References

Espionage role-playing games
Military role-playing games
Role-playing games introduced in 1986
Task Force Games games